This is a timeline of the history of gunpowder and related topics such as weapons, warfare, and industrial applications. The timeline covers the history of gunpowder from the first hints of its origin as a Taoist alchemical product in China until its replacement by smokeless powder in the late 19th century (from 1884 to the present day).

Pre-gunpowder formula
Major developments: Earliest stage of gunpowder development. Mentions of gunpowder ingredients and their uses in conjunction with each other.

9th century
Major developments: Earliest definite references to a gunpowder formula and awareness of its danger.

10th century
Major developments: Gunpowder is utilized in Chinese warfare and an assortment of gunpowder weapons appear. Fire arrows utilizing gunpowder as an incendiary appear in the early 900s and possibly rocket arrows as well by the end of the century. The gunpowder slow match is used for igniting flame throwers. The ancestor of firearms, the fire lance, also appears, but its usage in the 10th century is uncertain and no textual evidence for it exists during this period.

11th century
Major developments: The chemical formula for gunpowder is recorded in the Wujing Zongyao by 1044. Bombs appear in the early 11th century. Gunpowder becomes more common in the Song dynasty and production of gunpowder weapons is systematized. The Song court restricts trade of gunpowder ingredients with the Liao and Western Xia dynasties.

12th century
Major developments: Gunpowder fireworks are mentioned. Ships are equipped with trebuchets for hurling bombs. Earliest recorded usage of gunpowder artillery in ship to ship combat, first mention of the fire lance in battle, and the earliest possible depiction of a cannon appears.

13th century
Major developments: Bomb shells gain an iron casing. Fire lances are equipped with projectiles and reusable iron barrels. Rockets are used in warfare. "Fire emitting tubes" are produced in the Song dynasty by the mid-13th century and hand cannons are recorded to have been used in battle by the Yuan dynasty in 1287. The earliest extant cannons appear in China. The Mongols spread gunpowder weaponry to Japan, Southeast Asia, and possibly the Middle East as well as Europe. Europe and India both acquire gunpowder by the end of the century, but only in the Middle East are gunpowder weapons mentioned in any detail.

14th century
Major developments: Chinese gunpowder weaponry continues to advance with the development of one-piece cast iron cannons, accompanying carriages, and the addition of land mines, naval mines and rocket launchers. Earliest recorded instance of volley fire with gunpowder weaponry, by the Ming dynasty. The rest of the world catches up quickly and most of Eurasia acquires gunpowder weapons by the second half of the 14th century. Cannon development in Europe progresses rapidly and by 1374, cannons in Europe are able to breach a city wall for the first time. Breech loading cannons appear in Europe.

15th century
Major developments: Large-calibre artillery weighing several thousand kg are produced in Europe during the early 15th century and spread to the Ottoman Empire. Modifiable two wheeled gun carts known as limbers and caissons appear, greatly improving the mobility of artillery. The matchlock arquebus, the first firearm with a trigger mechanism, appears in Europe by 1475. Rifled barrels also appear in the late 15th century. The term musket is used for the first time in 1499. Rocket launchers are used in battle by the Ming dynasty and the Korean kingdom of Joseon develops a mobile rocket launcher vehicle called the hwacha. Chinese style bombs are used in Japan by 1468 at the latest.

16th century
Major developments: Matchlock firearms spread throughout Eurasia, reaching China and Japan by the mid-16th century. The volley fire technique is implemented using matchlock firearms by the Ottomans, Ming dynasty, and Dutch Republic by the end of the century. The arquebus is replaced by its heavier variant called the musket to combat heavily armoured troops. "Musket" becomes the dominant term for all shoulder arms fireweapons until the mid-19th century. The wheellock and flintlock trigger mechanisms are invented. Pistols and revolvers both appear during this period. Ottoman troops attach bayonets to their firearms. Both Europe and China develop handheld breech loading firearms. The star fort spreads across Europe in response to increasing effectiveness of siege artillery. The Ming dynasty uses gunpowder for hydraulic engineering.

17th century
Major developments: Bayonets spread across Eurasia. A paper cartridge is introduced by Gustavus Adolphus. Rifles are used for war by Denmark. A ship of the line carrying 60 to 120 cannons appears in Europe. Samuel Pepys' diary mentions a machine gun like pistol. The "true" flintlock replaces the snaphance flintlock in Europe by the end of the 17th century. Both China and Japan reject the flintlock and the Mughal Empire only uses it in limited quantities. Gunpowder is used for mining in Europe.

18th century
Major developments: Flintlocks completely displace matchlock firearms in Europe both on land and at sea. Sir William Congreve, 1st Baronet discovers "cylinder powder", gunpowder produced using charcoal in iron cylinders, which is twice as powerful as traditional gunpowder and less likely to spoil. He also invents block trail carriages, the most advanced artillery transport of the time. James Puckle invents a breechloader flintlock capable of firing 63 shots in seven minutes. The Kingdom of Mysore deploys iron cased rockets known as Mysorean rockets.

19th century
Major developments: Sir William Congreve, 2nd Baronet develops the Congreve rockets based on Mysorean rockets and British forces successfully deploy them against Copenhagen. Joshua Shaw invents percussion caps which replace the flintlock trigger mechanism. Claude-Étienne Minié invents the Minié ball, making rifles a viable military firearm, ending the era of smoothbore muskets. Subsequently rifles are deployed in the Crimean War with resounding success. Benjamin Tyler Henry invents the Henry rifle, the first reliable repeating rifle. Richard Jordan Gatling invents the Gatling gun, capable of firing 200 cartridges in a minute. Hiram Maxim invents the Maxim gun, the first single-barreled machine gun. Both China and Europe start using cast iron molds for casting cannons. Alfred Nobel invents dynamite, the first stable explosive stronger than gunpowder. Smokeless powder is invented and replaces the traditional "black powder" in Europe by the end of the century.

20th century
Major developments: Smokeless powder replaces traditional "black powder" across the globe, ending the gunpowder age.

See also
Timeline of the gunpowder age in Japan
Timeline of the gunpowder age in Korea
Timeline of the gunpowder age in South Asia
Timeline of the gunpowder age in Southeast Asia

Citations

References
 
 
 
 
 
 
 
 
 
 
 
 
 
 
 
 
 
 
 Hadden, R. Lee. 2005. "Confederate Boys and Peter Monkeys." Armchair General. January 2005. Adapted from a talk given to the Geological Society of America on 25 March 2004.
 
 
 
 
 
 
 
 
 
 
 
 

 
 
 
 
 
 
 
 
 
 

 
 
 
 
 
 
 
 
 
 

 
 
 Schmidtchen, Volker (1977a), "Riesengeschütze des 15. Jahrhunderts. Technische Höchstleistungen ihrer Zeit", Technikgeschichte 44 (2): 153–173 (153–157)
 Schmidtchen, Volker (1977b), "Riesengeschütze des 15. Jahrhunderts. Technische Höchstleistungen ihrer Zeit", Technikgeschichte 44 (3): 213–237 (226–228)
 
 .
 
 
 
 
 
 

Historical timelines
Warfare of the Middle Ages
Warfare of the Early Modern period
History of chemistry
Alchemy
Ammunition
Gunpowder
Weapon history